Neithea is an extinct genus of bivalve molluscs that lived from the Early Jurassic to the early Paleocene, with a worldwide distribution. Neithia sp. are inequivalve. That means that the two valves are not the same shape, the right valve being strongly concave and the left valve being flattened or concave. Sculpture consist of alternating strong and weaker radiating ribs.

Selected species 

 Neithea alpina
 Neithea atava
 Neithea biangulata
 Neithea coquandi
 Neithea gibbosa
 Neithea hispanica
 Neithea irregularis
 Neithea morrisi
 Neithea sexcostata
 Neithea striatocostata

References

Further reading 
 Fossils (Smithsonian Handbooks) by David Ward (Page 100)

Pectinida
Prehistoric bivalve genera
Jurassic bivalves
Cretaceous bivalves
Paleogene bivalves
Prehistoric animals of Africa
Extinct animals of Antarctica
Prehistoric animals of Asia
Prehistoric invertebrates of Oceania
Prehistoric animals of Europe
Prehistoric bivalves of North America
Cretaceous animals of South America
Early Jurassic genus first appearances
Fossil taxa described in 1864